Dwight Trible is an American jazz singer, living in Los Angeles. He has made albums in collaboration with Carlos Gabriel Niño, John Beasley, and Matthew Halsall, releasing them on Ninja Tune and Gondwana Records. He was an original member of Pure Essence.

Recognition
Mike Hobart, wrote in the Financial Times that "Trible has been forging his particular slant on spiritual-modal jazz for decades, delivering his love-is-the-answer message with clear diction, rich tones and a beautifully controlled vibrato. Trible's sonic range adds a dash of Isaac Hayes gravel to the imperious sonorities of Barry White, and, like them, he steeps his voice in the inflections of gospel-soul and the blues. But, having worked with the likes of Pharaoh Sanders and Charles Lloyd, he is equally in control of the nuances and demands of jazz."

Andrew Gilbert wrote in JazzTimes that "few musicians have done more to cultivate the L.A. [jazz] scene over the past four decades" than Trible.

Discography

Albums
Horace (Elephant, 2002) – a tribute to Horace Tapscott
Living Water (Ninja Tune, 2004)
 Love is the Answer by Dwight Trible & The Life Force Trio (Ninja Tune, 2005) – with Carlos Gabriel Niño
Cosmic (Katalyst, 2011)
Duality (2011) – with John Beasley
Inspirations (Gondwana, 2017) – with Matthew Halsall
Mothership (Gearbox, 2019)

Appearances

Albums
The Epic (2013) by Kamasi Washington - Trible contributes lead voice
Follow the Sun (2015) by Kahil El'Zabar

References

External links

Ninja Tune artists
21st-century African-American male singers
Singers from Los Angeles
American jazz singers
Living people
Year of birth missing (living people)